Cégep Gérald-Godin is a French-language public college located in Sainte-Geneviève, Montreal, Quebec, Canada. It is the first and only French-language public college on the West Island of Montreal.

It is located on Gouin Boulevard overlooking the Rivière des Prairies.  Its building, designed in 1932 by Lucien Parent, was formerly a novitiate of the Congregation of Holy Cross.

It is named after poet and separatist politician Gérald Godin.

Programs

Pre-university programs
 Creative Arts
 Science
 Social Sciences

Career programs
 Business Administration
 Computer Science 
 Computerized systems
 Pharmaceutical production

External links
 Official website

References 

Educational institutions established in 1999
Universities and colleges in Montreal
Colleges in Quebec
Gerald-Godin
L'Île-Bizard–Sainte-Geneviève
1999 establishments in Quebec